South Africa competed at the 2012 Summer Paralympics in London with a team of 62 athletes and finished 18th on the medal table.

The South African Sports Confederation and Olympic Committee (SASCOC), which is the National Paralympic Committee of South Africa, announced a team of 62 competitors for the 2012 Paralympics on 20 June 2012. The team of 45 men and 17 women were accompanied by 45 managers, coaches and other support staff. SASCOC released the team's schedule on 17 August 2012.

In a surprise announcement in London on 8 September the South African Minister of Sport and Recreation Fikile Mbalula said that Paralympic medal winners and their coaches would receive the same performance bonuses that their Olympic counterparts were promised. The amounts initially promised were significantly lower. The minister said the original plan was discriminatory.

Medalists

The following South African competitors won medals at the games.

| style="text-align:left; width:78%; vertical-align:top;"|

| style="text-align:left; width:22%; vertical-align:top;"|

Athletics

South African track and field athletes won a combined 17 medals at the Games, four gold, seven silver and six bronze. Sprinter Oscar Pistorius, who carried the nation's flag at the opening ceremony, was the most successful South African athlete winning individual gold in the T44 400 metres, gold in the 4 × 100 metres relay T42-46, setting world records in both, and individual silver in the T44 200 metres. In the 200 metres event Pistorius set a new world record in his heat, but he was defeated in the final by Brazilian Alan Oliveira. After the race Pistorius raised an issue about the length of Oliveira's blades, he later apologised for the timing of his remarks, but not the content of his complaint. The IPC confirmed the length of Oliveira’s blades were proportional to his body and legal, but expressed willingness to engage with Pistorius about the issue.

Men—track

Men—field

Women—track

Women—field

Management Team
Manager: Dion Bishop
Coaches: Suzanne Ferreira, Zelda Hansen, Hennie Koekemoer, Karin le Roux, Ampie Louw
Team assistant: Neels Matthyser
Helper: Illse du Preez.

Cycling

Road

Track

Management team
Manager: Mike Burns
Coach: Ricky Kulsen
Mechanic: Pieter Jansen.

Equestrian

A team of four represented South Africa in the equestrian competition, one man and three women, although Paralympic equestrian competition is not divided by gender. The competition consists of three dressage events, a championship test, a freestyle test and a team test. There are five competitor classes: Ia, Ib, II, III and IV, with Ia being the most and IV the least impaired.

Individual

Team

* Indicates the three best individual scores that count towards the team total.
Management team
Manager: Tracey Cumming
Coach: Chris Haazen
Vet: Sheelagh Higgerty
Grooms: Enoch Cele, Anton Chimbuanda, Elizabeth Newsome, Teri Smith

Rowing

Qualification Key: FA=Final A (medal); FB=Final B (non-medal); R=Repechage

Management
Manager/coach: Marco Galeone

Swimming

Natalie du Toit, a veteran of three Paralympics and one Olympics, announced her retirement from competitive swimming after this event.
South Africa's first gold medal came from du Toit winning gold in the women's 100 m butterfly S9.

Men

Women

Management team
Manager: Queeneth Ndlovu
Coach: Karoly Toros
Coach/tapper: Karin Hugo
Tapper/helper: Eeden Meyer

Wheelchair basketball

South Africa's men's wheelchair basketball team were in Group A with Australia, Italy, Spain, Turkey and the United States. Competing athletes are given an eight-level-score specific to wheelchair basketball, ranging from 0.5 to 4.5 with lower scores representing a higher degree of disability. The sum score of all players on the court cannot exceed 14.

Men's tournament

Group stage

11th/12th place match

Management team
Manager: Willie Riechert
Coach: Patrick Fick
Assistant coach: Shadrack Moepeng
Technical coach: Franck Belen

Wheelchair tennis

Management team
Manager/coach: Holger Losch
Assistant coach: Khotso Matshego.

General team management
The following people made-up the team's senior management:
 Chef de Mission: Pieter Badenhorst
 Project manager: Vinesh Maharaj
 Manager (logistics): Clifford Cobers
 Logistics: Madira Sehlapelo
 Manager (athletes services): Chantelle Jardim
 Athlete services: Dumisani Mtwa
 Chief medical officer: Wayne Derman
 Chief physiotherapist: Grace Hughes
 Doctor: Paul Maphoto
 Physiotherapists: Given Baloyi, Edwin Bodha, Greshne Davids, Shantal Edwards, Dan Ntseke, Evah Ramashala
 Classifier: Tarina van der Stockt

See also
South Africa at the 2012 Summer Olympics
South Africa at the Paralympics

References

General
 
Specific

External links
SASCOC National Paralympic Committee - Official website
Disability Sports South Africa - Official website
South African Sports Association for Physically Disabled - Official website

Nations at the 2012 Summer Paralympics
2012
Paralympics